Emily Martin (born 1944) is a sinologist, anthropologist, and feminist. Currently, she is a professor of socio-cultural anthropology at New York University. She received her undergraduate degree from the University of Michigan and her PhD degree from Cornell University in 1971. Before 1984, she published works under the name of Emily Martin Ahern.

Career
After earning a Ph.D. in anthropology, Martin was on the faculty of the University of California, Irvine and Yale University. In 1974, she joined the faculty of Johns Hopkins University; she was the Mary Elizabeth Garrett Professor of Arts and Sciences there between 1981 and 1994. She was a professor at Princeton University from 1994 to 2001 and then became a professor at New York University. In 2019, she was awarded the prestigious Vega Medal by the Swedish Society for Anthropology and Geography in recognition of her signal contributions to anthropology. In the same year she was also awarded the J.D. Bernal Prize by the Society for Social Studies of Science.

Sinology 
Martin's work on sinology focused on topics both in Mainland China and Taiwan. These topics included Chinese religion and rituals, architecture, politics, traditional Chinese medicine, Chinese women's culture, Chinese rural culture, Chinese lineages and genealogies, etc.

Anthropology of science and feminism 

Martin focuses the anthropology of science and analyzes science from a feminist perspective. Her work includes detailed analysis on human reproduction and related things. From her feminist perspective, Martin argues that current scientific literature is gender-biased, and that such bias has become entrenched in our language.  According to Martin, scientific explanations such as “the sperm forcefully penetrates the egg” are presented in a sexist way, to the disadvantage of women.

Martin began researching the analogies used in science education starting in 1982.  Pregnant with her second child, Martin noticed a pattern in her expecting parents' class how the woman's body and its parts were described and referred to "as if these things weren't a part of us."  Martin began with interviews with women regarding their perspective on female reproductive issues and compiled her research of interviews into a book called The Woman in the Body (1987).  Martin began to expand on her research by interviewing scientists and including the topic of male reproductive processes.  All of these topics were encompassed under fertilization and elaborated on in Martin's article The Egg and the Sperm: How Science Has Constructed a Romance Based on Stereotypical Male-Female Roles (1991).

For example, Martin notes that our perception on menstruation is usually negative and misogynistic. We tend to think menstruation as a failure, because the egg is not fertilized and the woman's uterine tissues begin to “break down” or “slough off".  Martin ascribes this perception to linguistic and cultural gender bias - words used to describe menstruation imply failure, dirtiness, structural breakdown and destruction, and wound. (By contrast, we do not perceive the shedding of the stomach lining as a structural failure.) This wound perception is reinforced by the fact that, during menstruation, the woman bleeds and may suffer from pain and discomfort.  Martin contends that menstruation is a normal physiological function and process (not a dirty thing or a “secret illness”), which should be viewed as a success - i.e., the success of the female body in avoiding pregnancy, the success of the female body in ridding itself of potentially harmful material from the uterus.  Yet, our language and culture prevent this.  Such gender bias is also responsible for our tendency to “praise” males for their “amazing” ability to produce a huge amount of sperm, Although the sperm is a lot cheaper, biologically, to produce compared to the egg, and the sperm suffer an extremely high mortality in the female reproductive tract. (Robbins and Larkin, 2007: 255)

Another example of Martin's feminist analysis of reproduction involves the egg and sperm. The egg (the Woman), in Martin's view, reinforces our culture's view of passive “damsel in distress” image, while the active sperm (the Man) races to the egg to penetrate her.  The truth is, the egg is not so easy to penetrate as commonly believed.  One sperm is not powerful enough to penetrate an egg - the egg's barrier can only be weakened by the collective efforts of a number of sperm.

Martin suggests alternative descriptions of fertilization that give the egg a less passive role.  She notes that research at the Johns Hopkins University has shown that the sperm does not have a powerful thrust, and fertilization occurs because the egg traps the sperm.

Furthermore, she notes that work by Paul Wassarman (conducted on the sperm and eggs of mice) singled out a particular molecule on the egg coat which binds the sperm.  This molecule was called a 'sperm receptor' which has passive connations, whereas the corresponding molecule on the sperm is the 'egg binding protein'.
"Usually in biological research, the protein member of the pair of binding molecules is called the receptor, and physically it has a pocket in it rather like a lock. As the diagrams that illustrate Wassarman's article show, the molecules on the sperm are proteins and have "pockets." The small, mobile molecules that fit into these pockets are called ligands. As shown in the diagrams, ZP3 on the egg is a polymer of "keys"; many small knobs stick out. Typically, molecules on the sperm would be called receptors and molecules on the egg would be called ligands. But Wassarman chose to name ZP3 on the egg the receptor and to create a new term, "the egg-binding protein," for the molecule on the sperm that otherwise would have been called the receptor."
Martin sees this as one of many example of sexist language entrenched in the imagery of reproduction, and resents the constant role of sperm as aggressor despite research which points otherwises.

Martin's analysis yields four main lessons: 1. We think we know a lot because of science in this age, but the truth is, the way we interpret science is sexist and it actually makes us ignorant (even worse, we are unaware of our ignorance for the most of the part). 2. Such gender bias reinforces gender inequality and continues to keep our traditional misogyny alive. 3. We have to realize our mistakes and strive to achieve a new understanding with total fairness. 4. We must ensure we will not pass the mistakes to the future generations, since they are really harmful for human understanding as well as gender relations.

Bipolar disorder 

Martin drew on her own experience with bipolar disorder to write Bipolar Expeditions: Mania and Depression in American Culture. In it, she argues that mania and depression have a cultural life outside the confines of psychiatry and that the extravagances of mood which might be dubbed 'irrational' are also present in the most 'rational' side of American life (for example, economics and the stock market.)

Publications

The Woman in the Body
Martin wrote the book The Woman in the Body, which won the first Eileen Basker Memorial Prize from the Society for Medical Anthropology. The book was first published in 1987, and then re-published with a new introduction in 2001 by Beacon Press. In this book Martin examines how American culture sees the process of reproduction. Emily Martin uses fieldwork to structure her arguments throughout this book. One key focus is the metaphor of economy that she analyzes in depth. She does this in order to show her readers that the social structure of the world she is examining is dependent on this metaphor in order to function efficiently.

Reviewing the book in American Anthropologist, Linda C. Garrow wrote "Overall, the book is strongest when it remains close to women's statements... Martin draws strong conclusions about the amount of resistance expressed by women that are not supported by the data... However, the insights, hypotheses, and challenges... will undoubtedly stimulate much research and make the book essential reading across a number of areas in medical anthropology." In  Isis, Anja Hiddinga called it "daring, well argued, and thoroughly supported by a wide range of references."

Labor

The most notable element that she produced in this book is the idea of seeing the woman as a machine that is there to create a product. Martin explains how the women's body is used over and over again in order to produce a child (product). Martin explains that this metaphor of labor dehumanizes the experience. The women is not taken into account for as a human being but her uterus is only seen as a tool that allows doctors to get closer to producing a new product.
“Uteruses produce ‘efficient or inefficient contractions’, good or poor labor by the amount of ‘progress made in certain periods of time.’”
The women being there only for mechanical reasons creates a dichotomy that connects women to their bodies, while men are more connected with their head. Men are delivering these babies and are thus in control of the situation.
This metaphor of labor is also reproduced in hospitals by making it an economical situation. The idea of scheduling appointments to have a baby is an attempt to have this experience  done in the fastest manner so that it is convenient for the doctor, as well as the company as a whole. In attempt to be as efficient as possible, hospitals’ focus is not on the experience of the woman in labor but creating a predictable experience that gets a woman out in ample amount of time and to continue to work as a machine and produce the product.

Premenstrual Syndrome

Emily Martin describes the relationship between premenstrual syndrome and the work place. She focuses on the idea that every single person experiences this time of month differently but examines that the Marxist way of thinking interferes with how an employer adapts to this situation. “An owner's profit is based on how much value can be squeezed out of laborers' work, the amount of time laborers would have to work and what they did (down to the precise movements of their hands and bodies) would be con- trolled by factory owners. Martin argues this idea is what needs to be changed. People are not black and white, situations occur but the fact that people are driven to produce the most they can in the shortest amount of time is the thing that needs to be changed. Martin does not propose that only women need to be treated better but all people in the workforce need to be accommodated- the young, the old, and the sick. Her argument is that although women and men experience hormonal surges, women are easier to target because they can attribute women's hormonal surges to their menstrual cycle.

The Egg and the Sperm
In the 1991 article, The Egg and the Sperm: How Science Has Constructed a Romance Based on Stereotypical Male-Female Roles, Emily Martin approaches scientific literature from the perspective of an anthropologist. She analyzes the metaphors that are used to teach biological concepts and makes the claim that these metaphors reflect the socially constructed "definitions of male and female". She focuses on analogies made in fertilization with the roles that the egg and sperm play, and points how words such as "debris", "sheds", and "dying" as opposed to "amazing", "produce", and "remarkable" insinuate that as "female biological processes" are inferior to male biological processes, so then must women be "less worthy than men".

Therefore, Martin argues that the female's reproduction system is portrayed as a failure because during their menstrual cycle, they are expelling one gamete per month while the male's reproduction system is producing millions of sperm each day. Martin describes the scientific accounts of reproductive biology, stating that they produce images of the egg and sperm often relying on stereotypes that prove to be key to our cultural definitions of male and female. These accounts, Martin claims, imply that the female biological processes are less worthy than that of the male. The language to describe the egg is more feminine, waiting to be rescued, while the sperm is described with a more masculine vocabulary.

However, Martin dispels this stereotype through research that proves that the egg is more aggressive than it has been previously described. Researchers at Johns Hopkins University ask the question about the mechanical force of the sperm's tail and concluded that the sperm is weak; therefore the female egg is more aggressive due to its adhesive molecules that can capture a sperm with a single bond and clasp it to the zona's surface.  Research also conducted by Gerald Schatten and Helen Schatten gives credit to both the egg and the sperm being mutually involved, but continues to use traditional vocabulary describing an aggressive sperm.

These studies simultaneously show scientists making an effort to change the previous analogies.  But in the attempt to shift the passive imagery of females, scientists have gone to the opposite extreme to depict the egg as a “dangerous” “spider woman” and the sperm as the “victim”, in concordance with another Western culture gender stereotype. Martin poses the idea of using gender neutral analogies instead.

When traditional metaphors are actively used, they project the image of the cellular level to the social level, making it “seem so natural as to be beyond alteration.”   These interpretations become “self-reinforcing” and can skew observations.  One way is as researcher Scott Gilbert describes: “if you don’t have an interpretation of fertilization that allows you to look at the eggs as active, you won’t look for the molecules that can prove it.”  The way that scientists choose to view their studies “guides [them] to ask certain questions and to not ask certain others.”
  
A solution to these negative imageries is not to just increase the number of females in biology, but rather to be aware of the biased metaphors.

Further reading 
 
 "An Anthropologist Investigates How We Think about How We Think", Ceridwen Gwen for the New Yorker Dec 29 2018

References 

Robbins, R.H. and S.N. Larkin. 2007. Cultural Anthropology, A Problem-Based Approach, First Canadian Edition, Thomson Nelson, Toronto.
Suzanne R. Kirschner 'From Flexible Bodies to Fluid Minds: An Interview with Emily Martin.' Ethos, Vol.27, No. 3 (1999), pp. 247–282 (Blackwell Publishing) Stable URL

External links
 Curriculum vitae
 Faculty webpage

Feminist studies scholars
Cornell University alumni
American women anthropologists
1944 births
Living people
People with bipolar disorder
Cultural anthropologists
New York University faculty
University of Michigan alumni
American women academics
21st-century American women